The Him Shinshar military installation was a Syrian government military site located west of Homs, Syria. According to the United States military, these sites were a "chemical weapons storage facility" and "chemical weapons bunker facility", respectively.

Both sites were destroyed during the April 2018 strike, which was led by the United States with British and French participation. The U.S. military said following the airstrikes that the Him Shinshar complex was "completely destroyed" in the airstrikes.

See also
Barzah scientific research centre, also targeted during the 2018 bombing

References

Buildings and structures in Homs Governorate
Chemical warfare facilities
Chemical weapons in the Syrian civil war